Luca Vigiani (born 25 August 1976) is an Italian football coach and a former midfielder. He is the head coach of the Under-19 (Primavera) squad of Bologna.

Coaching career
He was a coach at Watford under manager Walter Mazzarri, having previously coached under him at Inter Milan and Napoli.

In July 2021, he was appointed head coach of the Under-19 squad of Bologna.

References

External links
 FIGC – Statistiche in Nazionale
 
 Reggina calcio – Scheda Luca Vigiani

1976 births
ACF Fiorentina players
Reggina 1914 players
U.S. Livorno 1915 players
U.S. Pistoiese 1921 players
Bologna F.C. 1909 players
U.S. Fiorenzuola 1922 S.S. players
Italian footballers
Italy youth international footballers
Living people
Serie A players
Serie B players
Serie C players
Watford F.C. non-playing staff
Association football midfielders
Italian football managers